General elections were held in Singapore on 30 May 1959. They were held under the new constitution and were the first in which all 51 seats in the Legislative Assembly were filled by election. This was the first election victory for the People's Action Party (PAP), as they won a landslide victory with 43 seats, and the party has remained in power ever since these elections.

Background

Political developments
David Marshall, the politician who led the ruling Labour Front after winning the previous general election in 1955, was vocally anti-British and anti-colonialist, and the British found it difficult to come to an agreement or a compromise about a plan for self-government; Marshall resigned from the party a year later, pledging that he would either achieve self-government or to resign. In his place, Lim Yew Hock pursued an aggressive anti-communist campaign and manage to convince the British to make a definite plan for self-government.

By the time of the 1959 elections the Labour Front was in turmoil; Lim's strategy against the communists alienated a large part of the Chinese Singaporean electorate, which was the demographic targeted most during the anti-communist campaign. Lim's campaign also saw allegations of civil rights violations as many activists were detained without trial with the justification of internal security and tear gas were used against demonstrating students during the 1956 Chinese middle schools riots which were both anti-colonialist and anti-communist alike.

Constitutional reform
The Constitution of Singapore was revised accordingly in 1958, replacing the Rendel Constitution with one that granted Singapore self-government and the ability for its own population to fully elect its Legislative Assembly. Previously under the Rendel Constitution, drawn up in 1955 by a commission led by George William Rendel, the Legislative Assembly and its leaders could not fully be determined by the population; the British government appointed seven of the 32 members, with the remaining 25 seats elected by the public, albeit with limited suffrage. This itself was an improvement from the pre-1955 Legislative Council, electing nine members to the council.

This election was the first election after its full internal self-government granted by the British authorities; Singapore was now a recognised state, but was yet to gain full independence since the British still have external affairs such as the military and foreign relations. Due to the removal of suffrage restrictions, voting was implemented to be compulsory for the first time, and had done so in every election since 1959.

Parties
Chief Minister Lim Yew Hock formed Singapore People's Alliance on 10 November 1958, which consist of previously-elected Labour Front assembly members who were defected from Labour Front. SPA also invited members of Liberal Socialists and Workers' Party. SPA was formed to present a fresh image to voters in the lead up for the 1959 election, and ran on secure full employment and fair working conditions for workers, and achieving independence of Singapore through a merger with Malaya.

The tenure of Lim Yew Hock as Chief Minister, who succeeded Labour Front's David Marshall after his resignation in 1956, saw scant improvement to living conditions and unpopular tough measures on protesting unions. Lim's government also saw corruption during his tenure, and until the term expiry for Labour Front, all ten elected Assemblymen had resigned from the party due to credibility. These resignations saw the formation of three parties; in 1957, David Marshall founded the Workers' Party (one of the successful opposition parties of Singapore); in 1958, the Singapore People's Alliance (founded by Lim) and in 1959, the Citizens' Party.

SPA attempted to fight the record of the PAP administration in the City Council of Singapore with charges of corruptly appointing its supporters to fill up posts in the City Council, as well as raising concerns over the tenders of some Council contracts. The SPA even went as far as setting up a Commission of Inquiry in April 1959 to investigate whether there had been "irregularities or improprieties" in the working of the City Council. The inquiry, however, failed to reveal anything suspicious against the City Council and the hearings were adjourned indefinitely.

A new Party, Liberal Socialist Party (LSP) was formed by a merger of the Progressive Party and the Democratic Party. The Progressive Party which had won the 1948 and 1951 elections (but lost to Labour Front in the 1955 elections) had already fallen out of favour as it was perceived by much of the electorate by working for reform too slowly.

The Alliance was a coalition comprising the Singapore branch of three political parties from Malaya, namely the United Malays National Organisation (UMNO), the Malayan Chinese Association (MCA) and the Malayan Indian Congress (MIC), which they ran on raising the standards of living as well as to strengthen economic ties between Singapore and Malaya. As their parent parties were the ruling coalition in Malaya under Tunku Abdul Rahman, the Alliance promised voters that it could work for an early merger if voted into power as they knew "exactly" what their Malayan counterparts wanted.

The Malay Union which ran together with UMNO and MCA in the 1955 election, had been expelled from their alliance for putting up a candidate in the 1957 Cairnhill by-election.

The current opposition party, People's Action Party, announced to contest 51 seats in the election; they released their election manifesto entitled The Tasks Ahead, and outlined the party's five-year plan to address acute problems faced by Singapore. It called for a series of policies and programmes such as the provision of low-cost housing, the strengthening of education, as well as the development of industries thus improving employment opportunities for the local population. These were in addition to the goal of attaining independence for Singapore through a merger with the Federation of Malaya.

The PAP campaigned against corruption under the Lim Yew Hock government, and all party members and candidates wore a distinctive outfit of white shirts and pants (which is still the uniform of PAP candidates as of today) to represent "cleanliness" in government. SPA attempted to portray the PAP as a party being controlled by the communists, and such claims were repeated by Liberal Socialists and UMNO. Lee Kuan Yew brushed off the claims, describing them as "silly", "blabbering" and "lies".

Timeline

Changes to electoral boundaries

The 51 seats of the Legislative Assembly were elected from single-member constituencies, with an increase of 26 seats in this election. The changes among the constituencies were:

Campaign
Many of the campaign issues surrounded the topic of government corruption and independence of Singapore, as well as political issues such as the communist insurgency led by the Malayan Communist Party (MCP), which had been causing the Malayan Emergency. The desire for independence and self-government epitomised by the Malay term Merdeka (which translates to Independence or Free), had started to become immediate. This was reflected when the cry of "We want Merdeka now!" was taken up by those demanding immediate independence.

Prior to the polling day, the press had predicted that the presence of multi-cornered fights would only split the anti-PAP vote, raising chances of a PAP victory.

Chew Swee Kee affair
The Chew Swee Kee affair was also a notable issue raised in the May 1959 elections. In February 1959, PAP charged the incumbent SPA government with receiving political funds from the United States government.

Investigations by a Commission of Inquiry later revealed that Chew Swee Kee, who was then Education Minister, had converted the alleged funds for his own use. The claim has it that Chew accepted around $700,000 to $800,000 from an unrevealed donor in New York City as a "political gift". Chew promptly stepped down from his post on 4 March 1959. The incident is credited for causing the SPA's downfall.

The revelation had a devastating effect on the image of SPA as the party was seen to be serving a Western power, betraying Singapore's anti-colonial movement.

Results
The result was a landslide win for the PAP, with the SPA lost 35 of the 39 contested constituencies and only four members represented the new Assembly. The Labour Front saw a negative swing of about 27% and failed to win any seats. The right-wing coalition party, the Liberal Socialist Party (which formed by a merger of the Democratic Party and Progressive Party) saw a disastrous performance with all of the 32 candidates were defeated, among them 20 candidates who lost their election deposits. A total of 73 candidates lost their $500 election deposit.

PAP candidate Wong Soon Fong was the best performing candidate in this election in percentage terms, polling 77.66% while LSP candidate Lillian Tan was the worst performing candidate polling 0.82%. In absolute numbers, PAP's Goh Keng Swee was the best performing candidate polling 9,313 votes while LSP's Lillian Tan was the worst performing candidate polling 64 votes.

The election, which saw implementations of compulsory voting and the removal of suffrage restrictions, saw a huge increase in voter turnout, with 90.07% of the voters (or 527,919 of the 586,098 registered voters), as compared to 52.66% from the previous election.

By constituency

Aftermath
The PAP was able to form a new government which could now adopt domestic policy without oversight from the colonial administration. The United Kingdom still however controlled the military forces, foreign affairs and had a joint responsibility in internal security under agreement. However, historians saw 1959 as the year Singapore achieved self-governance as a result of the new government, even though the Constitution had been amended in 1958.

On the afternoon of 5 June, Lee Kuan Yew was sworn in as the first Prime Minister at City Hall by Yang di Pertuan Negara William Goode along with members of his cabinet.

Before taking over, Lee pardoned several PAP members, who had been arrested under the Emergency Regulation in 1956 and 1957, including left-wing leader Lim Chin Siong. During the election campaign, Lee had called for pardon as part of his election platform, causing an increase of morale of many trade union members.

After their release, Lim and his affiliates would later challenge Lee's leadership in the PAP, leading to the expulsion of most of the left-wing members from the PAP in 1961. The expelled members would then form the Barisan Sosialis, and posed a strong challenge against the PAP on the next election in 1963; although being crippled by Operation Coldstore, they came closer to removing the PAP from power than any other party to date.

By-elections

Two by-elections, both held in 1961, occurred during the term in Parliament. Former PAP minister Ong Eng Guan was re-elected in Hong Lim running as an independent after leaving the PAP, whilst David Marshall was elected in Anson after the death of PAP MP Baharuddin Mohammed Ariff.

References

Bibliography

External links
General Elections 1959 Singapore Elections

General elections in Singapore
Singapore
1959 in Singapore